Watford Football Club is an English football club from Watford, Hertfordshire. Formed on 15 April 1898 as a result of the amalgamation of two strong local clubs, Watford St. Mary's and West Herts.  West Herts began life as Watford Rovers in 1881, the club entered the FA Cup for the first time in 1886. In the same year, they also entered the county-wide Herts Senior Cup, reaching the final six times over the next ten years. Watford Rovers became West Herts in 1891, and joined the Southern League for the 1896–97 season. The team started to change from one composed entirely of amateurs to one including paid professionals. In 1898, West Herts amalgamated with Watford St Mary's to form a new club, Watford Football Club.

The club participated in the Southern League from 1896 until 1920, experiencing considerable success. They won six league titles in this period, including the Southern League First Division in 1914–15. After the resumption of Southern League football following a four-year hiatus due to the First World War, Watford missed out on a second consecutive title in 1919–20 on goal average. They joined the Football League Third Division in the 1920–21 season, and following its subsequent reorganisation became founder members of the Third Division South in 1921.

Watford competed in the Third Division South for the next 37 years, with little success. Fred Pagnam finished as the Division's top scorer in 1922–23, the club reached the final of the Third Division South Cup in 1935 and 1937 (winning on the latter occasion), and Len Dunderdale scored 21 goals for Watford in 1938–39 despite leaving midway through the season. The team started to progress after the reorganisation of the Football League into four national divisions in 1958. They won promotion to the Third Division in 1960, the Second Division in 1969, and reached the FA Cup semi-final in 1970. However, the league progress was reversed with two relegations over the next five years, and in 1976–77 Watford were briefly bottom of the entire Football League.

A turning point in the club's history came in the late 1970s. Singer, shareholder and lifelong Watford supporter Elton John became chairman in 1976, and appointed Graham Taylor as manager in 1977. The club achieved consecutive promotions between 1977 and 1979, and reached the First Division for the first time in their history in 1982. Furthermore, in 1982–83 Watford finished second in the First Division, and Luther Blissett was the division's top scorer with 27 goals. Consequently, Watford qualified for the UEFA Cup in 1983–84. They also reached their first FA Cup final, losing 2–0 to Everton at Wembley Stadium. Following Taylor's departure in 1987, Watford were relegated in 1988.

Watford remained in English football's second tier for eight seasons, until they were relegated in 1995–96. Taylor returned as manager in 1997, and for the second time in his career led Watford to consecutive promotions, although he was unable to prevent relegation from the Premier League in 1999–2000. In the 21st century Watford have reached three FA Cup semi-finals, one League Cup semi-final, and spent three further season in the Premier League after winning the 2006 Football League Championship play-off final under the management of Aidy Boothroyd and following automatic promotion under Slaviša Jokanović in 2015.

Key

South 1 = Southern League First Division
South 2 = Southern League Second Division
South 2L = Southern League Second London Division
Premier League = Premier League
Championship = EFL Championship
Division 1 = Football League First Division
Division 2 = Football League Second Division
Division 3 = Football League Third Division
Division 3S = Football League Third Division South
Division 4 = Football League Fourth Division
BCCL = Bucks & Contiguous Counties League
United = United League

Pld = Matches played
W = Matches won
D = Matches drawn
L = Matches lost
GF = Goals for
GA = Goals against
Pts = Points
Pos = Final position
PR  = Preliminary Round
QR1 = First Qualifying Round
QR2 = Second Qualifying Round
QR3 = Third Qualifying Round

QR4 = Fourth Qualifying Round
QR5 = Fifth Qualifying Round
QR6 = Sixth Qualifying Round
R1 = Round 1
R2 = Round 2
R3 = Round 3
R4 = Round 4
R5 = Round 5
QF = Quarter-finals
SF = Semi-finals
F = Final
W = Winners

Seasons

Early history
The club was formed on 15 April 1898 as a result of the amalgamation of two strong local clubs, Watford St. Mary's and West Herts.  West Herts began life as Watford Rovers in 1881, when George Devereux de Vere Capell, Earl of Essex and owner of Cassiobury Park, gave a group of boys permission to use the grounds for football. However, the agreement stipulated that the team could not play organised competitive matches on the estate. Members of the group included Henry Grover, the man later recognised as the club's founder, and Charlie Peacock, who played for Hertfordshire, became involved with board meetings at the club, and became the proprietor of the Watford Observer, the local newspaper. Over the next five years the team participated exclusively in friendly matches against schools and local clubs. Matches played when the club was not entering competitions included the first recorded fixture against future rivals Luton Town; a 1–0 home win to Watford on 5 December 1885. In the 1886–87 season, Watford Rovers entered the FA Cup for the first time, although they were eliminated in their opening game. They have competed in at least one competition in every season since. From 1886 Rovers participated in the Herts Senior Cup, a competition open to all clubs in Hertfordshire, winning it on four occasions. They also participated in the Hennessey Cup—open to clubs within a  radius of Uxbridge—between 1888 and 1891. Rovers' first match against Watford St Mary's was a 7–4 home win on 17 January 1891. The teams met on eleven further occasions prior to their amalgamation in 1898. In total, Rovers and their successors West Herts won six times, St Mary's four times, and the remaining two matches ended in draws.

League history

From 1896–97 until 1919–20, the Football League and Southern League ran in parallel, and were organised by separate bodies. The Southern League was therefore not part of the English football league pyramid. In 1920–21, the Southern League First Division was absorbed by the Football League, thus becoming part of the English football pyramid, initially as the Football League Third Division. From 1921–22 until 1957–58, the Third Division South operated as the third highest level of English football, running in parallel with the Third Division North. From 1958–59 until 1991–92, Division 1 was the highest level of English football, Division 2 the second highest, Division 3 the third highest and Division 4 the fourth highest. The Premier League was formed in 1992–93, and since then has been the highest level of English football. Division 1 became the second level, and Division 2 the third level. In 2004–05, Division 1 was renamed as the Football League Championship.

Footnotes

References

General

Specific

Seasons
 
Watford